Princess Changle, born Li Lizhi; (621 – September 28, 643) was a princess of the Tang dynasty. She was the fifth daughter of Emperor Taizong of Tang, and the oldest daughter of Empress Zhangsun.

Biography
According to her epitaphs, Li Lizhi was a smart lady, with bright personality and beautiful appearance. So that she got favored by her parents, Taizong and Empress Zhangsun. Li Lizhi was also a painter.

At the age of 8, Li Lizhi got the princess title. Li Lizhi married her cousin Zhangsun Chong, the son of Zhangsun Wuji in 633.

Taizong would add the dowry for Li Lizhi's marriage. The chancellor Fang Xuanling suggested him that her dowry could be doubled, compared with Taizong's sister, Princess Yongjia. However, Taizong did not do that because Wei Zheng said it is the overstepping of Confucius rule. Empress bestowed Wei Zheng for his justice.

Li Lizhi had a son, Zhangsun Yan.

Death
Li Lizhi died on September 28, 643, probably genetic respiratory disease, the same cause as her mother. Taizong felt strong sadness because of her death at a young age. She was buried in Zhao Mausoleum beside her parents.

Tomb
Li Lizhi's tomb is just beside Zhao Mausoleum. It was opened in 1991. In her tomb, there are murals on the walls, and pottery tomb figures.

The most famous mural in the tomb is a paint of cart and house in the cloud. The murals illustrated the technique of painting during the Tang dynasty.

References

621 births
643 deaths
Tang dynasty princesses
7th-century Chinese women
7th-century Chinese people
Emperor Taizong of Tang
Daughters of emperors